John Spicer may refer to:

Politicians
John Spicer (Australian politician) (1899–1978)
John Spicer (died 1623), MP for Dorchester
John Spicer (fl. 1421), MP for Derby
John Spicer (died 1423/4), MP for Bishop's Lynn
John Spicer (died c.1428), MP for Oxford

Others
John Spicer (footballer) (born 1983), English footballer
John Spicer/Spencer (martyr), burnt 1556, in the Marian persecutions

See also
Jack Spicer (disambiguation)